Myadora antipodum is a bivalve mollusc of the family Myochamidae.

References
 Powell A. W. B., New Zealand Mollusca, William Collins Publishers Ltd, Auckland, New Zealand 1979 

Myochamidae
Bivalves of New Zealand
Molluscs described in 1880